Winter Park is a city in Orange County, Florida, United States. The population was 29,795 according to the 2020 census. It is part of the Orlando–Kissimmee–Sanford, Florida Metropolitan Statistical Area.

Winter Park was founded as a resort community by northern business magnates in the late 19th and early 20th centuries. Its main street, called Park Avenue, is located in the middle of town. It includes civic buildings, retail, art galleries, a private liberal arts college (Rollins College), museums, a park, a train station, a golf course country club, a historic cemetery, and a beach and boat launch.

History

The Winter Park area's first human residents were migrant Muscogee people who had earlier intermingled with the Choctaw and other indigenous people. In a process of ethnogenesis, the Native Americans formed a new culture which they called "Seminole", a derivative of the Mvskoke' (a Creek language) word simano-li, an adaptation of the Spanish cimarrón which means "wild" (in their case, "wild men"), or "runaway" [men]. The site was first inhabited by Europeans in 1858, when David Mizell Jr. bought an 8-acre (32,000 m2) homestead between Lakes Virginia, Mizell, and Berry. A settlement, called Lake View by the inhabitants, grew up around Mizell's plot. It got a post office and a new name—Osceola—in 1870.

The area did not develop rapidly until 1880, when a South Florida Railroad track connecting Orlando and Sanford was laid a few miles west of Osceola. Shortly afterwards, Loring Chase came to Orange County from Chicago to recuperate from a lung disease. In his travels, he discovered the pretty group of lakes just east of the railbed. He enlisted a wealthy New Englander, Oliver E. Chapman, and they assembled a very large tract of land for $13,000 on July 4, 1881. They planned the town of Winter Park on this piece of land. Over the next four years they plotted the town, opened streets, built a town hall and a store, planted orange trees, and required all buildings to meet stylistic and architectural standards. Winter Park was a heavily planned city, something that is still evident in its streets’ grindlike organization. The town was then promoted heavily, especially to snow birds in the north looking for a place to hibernate in the winter. During this founding time, the Winter Park Post Office opened, and the railroad constructed a depot, connected to Osceola by a dirt road.

In 1885, a group of businessmen started the Winter Park Company and incorporated it with the Florida Legislature; Chase and Chapman sold the town to the new company. In a land bubble characteristic of Florida history, land prices soared from less than $2 per acre to over $200, with at least one sale recorded at $300 per acre. This land bubble concept would never go away, with towns and counties directly surrounding the area with exponentially cheaper land prices.

In 1885, the Congregational Assembly of Florida started Rollins College, the state's first four-year college. Rollins College today remains one of the hallmarks of Winter Park. It is the second most expensive college in the state with a tuition of $64,972 per year. Rollins is a relatively good, small liberal arts school with a total student body of just over 2,000 students. However, the high price makes the overall rating of the school more into the middle of the pack of colleges around the country. The school's business school is the Crummer School of Business. where students can earn a MBA, is a premier Business School. It is the number one business school in Florida. Rollins has been and will always be an integral part of Winter Park's history and culture. Back in 1886, the Seminole Hotel on Lake Osceola opened. This was a resort complete with the luxuries of the day: gas lights, steam heating, a string orchestra, a formal dining room, a bowling alley, and long covered porches. Today, this street is a cul de sac called Kiwi Circle that is part of one of the nicest neighborhoods in the town.

Presidential visits
The first president to visit was Chester A. Arthur, who reported that Winter Park was "the prettiest place I have seen in Florida",. President Grover Cleveland visited the area and was given a huge reception at the Seminole Hotel on February 23, 1888. He enjoyed the Bounding Horse Cart ride and stated that it was the most pleasant diversion of his Florida trip. The New York Times reported on his visit that "The Philadelphian and Bostonian founders had done a good job with the town."

The following four years both hotel and the town became a fashionable winter resort for northern visitors. The next president to visit the area was Franklin D. Roosevelt in March 1936. He was conferred an honorary degree in literature at Rollins College.

President Barack Obama visited Rollins College on August 2, 2012, to give a speech that was part of his re-election campaign. An interesting note on recent Presidential elections is that Orange County, the county Winter Park is in, was one of the bluest counties in Florida. Although Winter Park is a large mix of both conservative and liberal constituents. However, this mix is evident in US Congressional District 7's last two representatives. Former Republican Congressman John Mica lost reelection in 2016 to newcomer and Democrat Stephanie Murphy. Both have had a lot of support from both sides of the aisle and Murphy is credited with being one of the most centrist representatives in Congress today.

Winter Park Public Library
The Winter Park Public Library was historically located at 460 E. New England Avenue in the heart of Winter Park. Its origins date back to 1885, when nine women organized to create a lending library for their small community, which was still in its infancy at the time. The Winter Park Public Library underwent major changes and moved to a new site. It opened in late 2021 on a new world-class campus designed by world-renowned architect Sir David Adjaye.

Peacocks
In 1904, Charles Hosmer Morse became the biggest landowner in Winter Park. His patronage continued in the 1920s, when he purchased a 200-acre parcel between lakes Virginia, Berry, and Mizell. In 1945, Morse's granddaughter Jeannette and her husband Hugh McKean moved to the land, and soon after they added peacocks. Now, the land is a nature preserve that houses an orange grove and over 30 peacocks. Winter Park locals consider the peacock to be a pet to the entire community. The peacock is on the official Winter Park seal, is featured in a number of official city documents, and is protected by the community. Peacocks often roam around in neighborhoods, especially throughout the community of Windsong, where residents are often seen taking care of them.

The Winter Park Sinkhole 

In 1972, Henry Swanson, an agricultural agent and "resident layman expert on Central Florida water,"  wrote a letter to the editor warning Orange County mayors of the sinkhole danger that could be posed by overdevelopment and excessive groundwater use. Swanson predicted that the west Winter Park area would be especially at risk.  In May 1981, during a period of record-low water levels in Florida's limestone aquifer, a massive sinkhole opened near the corner of Denning Drive and Fairbanks Avenue.

The sinkhole first appeared on the evening of May 8, 1981, near the house of Winter Park resident Mae Rose Williams. Within a few hours, a 40-year-old sycamore tree near her house had fallen into the sinkhole. In a story in the Orlando Sentinel, she said that as the sun rose, she heard a noise "like giant beavers chewing" as the hole began to devour more of her land. The hole was collapsing rapidly. By noon, as she realized that her home was slipping into the expanding hole, she and the family evacuated and removed their belongings. That afternoon her house fell into the sinkhole, and within a few hours the house was irrevocably on its way into the sinkhole's center, headed to unknown depths.

The following fell into the sinkhole: five Porsches at a repair shop, a pickup truck with camper top, the Winter Park municipal pool, and large portions of Denning Drive. Damage was estimated at $2 million to $4 million. On May 9, 1981, the sinkhole grew to a record size, gulping down 250,000 cubic yards of soil and taking with it the deep end of an Olympic-size swimming pool, chunks of two streets and Williams' three-bedroom home and yard. Florida engineers have described the event as "the largest sinkhole event witnessed by man as a result of natural geological reasons or conditions." They based their statements on his study of 2,000 sinkholes over more than 40 years. That opinion was echoed by Ardaman & Associates, a local engineering consulting firm.

The sinkhole drew national attention and became a popular tourist attraction during the summer of 1981. A carnival-like atmosphere arose around the area, with vendors selling food, balloons, and T-shirts to visitors. The city of Winter Park sold sinkhole photographs for promotional and educational purposes. On July 9, 1981, Winter Park began selling sinkhole photographs to educate the community about sinkholes and to promote tourism. The sinkhole began to fill with water that summer, but on July 19, the water level suddenly dropped by a reported .

As the novelty wore off, the city worked to repair the damage. Workers were able to recover four of the six vehicles that fell into the sinkhole, including the travel trailer, whose owner drove it away, and three of the five Porsches. The other two remain at the bottom of the lake with Mae Rose Owens' home. Engineers filled in the bottom with dirt and concrete.  Diver reports from 2009 suggest that the lake has since been used to dispose of unwanted vehicles. Besides a 1987 incident in which the bottom of the lake suddenly dropped , causing erosion on the southern rim, the stabilized sinkhole has been generally quiet.

The Langford Resort Hotel
The Langford Hotel served as a gateway to "Old Florida" attractions in Central Florida and a community social hub for decades.

Famous guests included Dean Martin, Frank Sinatra, Ray Charles, Larry King, Hugh Hefner, John Denver, Langford winter resident Lady Bird Johnson, and President Ronald Reagan and his wife Nancy Reagan, who celebrated their 24th wedding anniversary there.  Reagan gave a campaign speech at Rollins College and stayed at the Langford in 1976.

The Langford was celebrated in a party in late 1999, closed, and was demolished.  A portion of the former Langford property (as of mid-2009) has been developed into luxury mid-rise condominiums.  The remaining parcel was redeveloped and in 2014, a boutique hotel named the Alfond Inn, owned and operated by Rollins College opened at the site of the original Langford Hotel. The Alfond Inn was built with a $12.5 million grant from the Harold Alfond Foundation. Net operating income from the Inn is directed to The Alfond Scholars program fund, the College's premier scholarship fund.

The Temple Grove
An orange grove, known as the Temple Grove, stood on the south side of Palmer Avenue just east of Temple Drive.  The temple orange was grown on the old Wyeth grove on Palmer Avenue (later Temple Grove) owned at the time by Louis A. Hakes, whose son was the first to notify Temple of the different quality of the new orange. The orange was introduced and cataloged by Buckeye Nursery in 1917, the year W. C. Temple died.  Myron E. Gillett and his son D. Collins Gillett later went on to plant the largest orange grove in the world in the 1920s in Temple Terrace, Florida.

The Winter Park Sidewalk Art Festival
The Winter Park Sidewalk Art Festival is one of the nation's oldest, largest juried outdoor art festivals, rated among the top shows by Sunshine Artist and American Style magazines.  In 2012, about 1,200 artists from around the world applied for entry, and an independent panel of judges selected 225 national and international artists to attend the show. The National Endowment for the Arts, the White House, Congress, and many others have lauded the Festival for promoting art and art education in Central Florida. An all-volunteer board of directors runs the annual festival.

Geography

The city is northeast of and adjacent to Orlando.

It is nestled among the Winter Park Chain of Lakes, a series of lakes interconnected by a series of navigable canals, which were originally created for flood control and to run logs to a sawmill on present-day Lake Virginia. The lakes are popular for boating, watersports, fishing and swimming.

The city is traversed by the old East Florida and Atlantic Railroad ("Dinky Line") railroad bed, which until the 1960s had a stop at Lake Virginia/Rollins College at the city park now known as Dinky Dock. Much of this right of way has been converted to a rail-trail pedestrian/biking path in the form of the Cady Way Trail, which leads from Cady Way Park toward the Baldwin Park neighborhood and downtown Orlando, and in the opposite direction to Oviedo and beyond (via the Florida Trail), due to a new pedestrian bridge spanning Semoran Boulevard (SR 436) in Orange County.

SunRail operates a rail line through Winter Park on the former Atlantic Coast Line, with an Amtrak and SunRail commuter rail station in downtown's historic Central Park.

Demographics

As of the census of 2020, there were 29,131 people, 13,072 households, and 7,055 families residing in the city. The population density was 3,401.6 inhabitants per square mile (1,283.97	/km2). There were 14,073 housing units at an average density of 1,606.5 per square mile (620.3/km2). The racial makeup of the city was 84.6% White, 4.7% African American, 0.22% Native American, 4.8% Asian, 0.04% Pacific Islander, 1.5% from other races, and 4.4% from two or more races. Hispanic or Latino of any race were 11.0% of the population.

There were 13,072 households, out of which 22.8% had children under the age of 18 living with them, 41.0% were married couples living together, 33.5% had a female householder with no husband present, and 7.3% were non-families. 33.6% of all households were made up of individuals, and 18.7% had someone living alone who was 65 years of age or older. The average household size was 2.22 and the average family size was 2.96.

In the city the population was spread out, with 3.5% under the age of 5, 17.3% under the age of 18, 82.7% aged 18 years and over, and 22.3% who were 65 years of age or older. The median age was 45.3 years.

According to justicemap.org, the area of Winter Park to the east of Park ave is 99.2% white. Directly west of Park Ave, these numbers completely flip and the area is around 80% Black. The enclave of neighborhoods that is to the west of Park Ave but east of North Orlando Ave is the area that is predominantly black. Close to Interstate 4, the main highway of the area, the population is also more Black than the surrounding areas. 

As of July 1, 2021 the estimated population is 29,131.

Economy

Personal income
The median income for a household in the city was $80,500, and the median income for a family was $130,120. Males had a median income of $83,738 versus $58,277 for females. The per capita income for the city was $65,481.  About 7.0% of families and 9.9% of the population were below the poverty line, including 11.4% of those under age 18 and 10.2% of those age 65 or over.

However, what opportunityatlas.org shows is that these incomes are very divided based on where you live within Winter Park. The area to the northeast of Park Ave is the most affluent part with an average household income of $44,000. There are still houses with significant higher incomes within these parts. The “Via” streets are one of the most affluent neighborhoods. This area includes the Isle of Sicily, a private drive that juts out into Lake Maitland with extremely expensive houses and residents such as Doc Rivers and Carrot Top. To the east of Park Ave, the area is slightly less affluent with an average household income of $32,000. However, many of these are still very expensive lakefront properties. The lowest income area is to the west of Park Ave with an average household income of $23,000. Many of these houses include those built by the non-profit organization Habitat for Humanity. There is no local middle or elementary school for this area.

Tourism
Scenic Olde Winter Park area is punctuated by small, winding brick streets, and a canopy of old southern live oak and camphor trees, draped with Spanish moss. There are hundreds of thousands of visitors to annual festivals  including the Bach Festival, the nationally ranked Sidewalk Art Festival, and the Winter Park Concours d'Elegance. Winter Park is often seen as a popular tourist destination for those visiting Orlando that want an escape from the typical tourist scene of the Orlando theme parks. There is a quaint, local feel to the town even though there are a lot of tourists, especially during the winter months and holidays.

Within the city is the Mead Botanical Garden which is a  park that encompasses several ecosystems. It has an amphitheater, butterfly garden, discovery barn and a recreation center. Many structures are more than 100 years old.

Industry
Bonnier Corporation is based in Winter Park. D100 Radio was founded here and is still present in Winter Park.

According to the City's 2021 Comprehensive Annual Financial Report, the top employers in the city are:

Educational institutions

 St. Margaret Mary Catholic School 
 Aloma Elementary School
 Brookshire Elementary School
 Chesterton Academy of Orlando
 The Geneva School
 Glenridge Middle School
 Lakemont Elementary School
 The Parke House Academy
High schools
 Lake Howell High School
 Trinity Preparatory School
 Winter Park High School
Colleges
 Rollins College
 Full Sail University
 Valencia College, Winter Park Campus
 Fortis College, Winter Park Campus
 Winter Park Tech
 Crealde School of Art

Sites of interest

Park Avenue Shopping and Restaurant district
 Scenic Boat Tours off East Morse Boulevard
 All Saints Episcopal Church
 Annie Russell Theatre
 Edward Hill Brewer House
 Casa Feliz Historic House Museum
 Comstock-Harris House
 D100 Studio One (closed to the public)
 Lake Baldwin Park
 Hannibal Square 
 Hannibal Square Heritage Center
 Kraft Azalea Park
 Mead Botanical Garden
 Charles Hosmer Morse Museum of American Art
 Mount Moriah Missionary Baptist Church
 Albin Polasek Museum and Sculpture Gardens
 Rollins Museum of Art
 Winter Park Historical Museum
Winter Park Farmers' Market
 Winter Park Public Library
 Winter Park Sidewalk Art Festival
 Woman's Club of Winter Park

Notable people
Dorothy Deming, nurse and author 
George Eddy, US-French basketball player and basketball commentator
Samuel Gibbs French, Confederate Major General
Logan Gilbert, Baseball Player
Bruce Magruder, US Army major general
Stephanie Murphy, Congressperson
 John Martin and Prestonia Mann Martin

Transportation

Public Transit
 Lynx
 Winter Park station (SunRail/Amtrak)

Major Roads

See also
List of people from Winter Park, Florida

References

External links

 City of Winter Park official website
 Winter Park Police Department
 Winter Park Fire-Rescue Department
 Winter Park Public Library
 Winter Park Citrus Grove History
 Explore Winter Park, community website
 Winter Park sinkhole archive footage

 
Cities in Florida
Cities in Orange County, Florida
Cities in the Greater Orlando
Academic enclaves